Rails with trails (RWT) are a small subset of rail trails in which a railway right-of-way remains in use by trains yet also has a parallel recreational trail.  Hundreds of kilometers of RWTs exist in Canada, Europe, the United States, and Western Australia.

United States 
As of 2000, there were 1,000 rail trails in operation nationwide, comprising a total length of about 17,750 km /11,029 mi. Only 60 (387 km/240 mi) were rails with trails, up from 37 (246 km/152 mi) in 1996.

United States rails with trails with articles on Wikipedia:
California
Ohlone Greenway
E Line
G Line
Sacramento Southern Railroad (SSRR)
Sonoma–Marin Area Rail Transit
Illinois
Green Bay Trail
Indiana
Calumet Trail
Maryland
Western Maryland Scenic Railroad
Minnesota
Cedar Lake Trail
Hiawatha LRT Trail
Kenilworth Trail
Midtown Greenway
Southwest LRT Trail
New Jersey
Traction Line Recreation Trail
Henry Hudson Trail
New Mexico
Santa Fe Southern Railway
Ohio
Camp Chase Trail/Camp Chase Railway
Pennsylvania
D&L Trail
Five Star Trail
Schuylkill River Trail
Washington
Burke-Gilman Trail
Pierce County Foothills Trail

Safety 

A 1997 study of the feasibility of rails with trails identified a need for guidelines concerning RWT crossings, fencing, setbacks, and other items.  These guidelines were developed in the form of Rails-with-Trails: Lessons Learned, which finds that "well-designed RWTs meet the operational needs of railroads, often providing benefits in the form of reduced trespassing and dumping. A poorly designed RWT will compromise safety and function for both trail users and the railroad."

A 1996 study of safety on rails with trails in the United States evaluated 37 existing RWTs in 16 states and concluded that "active railroad lines can function with an adjacent pedestrian, horse, and bike path without problem" and RWTs are "no more dangerous than rail-trails alone or next to busy streets."

See also 
Footpath
Rail trail
Sidewalk
Tunnel of Love (railway)

References

Further reading

External links